Collendina is a genus of Australian "coastal scaled crickets" in the tribe Mogoplistini.

Species
The Orthoptera Species File lists:
 Collendina elanora Otte & Alexander, 1983
 Collendina fascipes (Chopard, 1951)
 Collendina iterala Otte & Alexander, 1983
 Collendina kira Otte & Alexander, 1983
 Collendina mamoura Otte & Alexander, 1983
 Collendina ora Otte & Alexander, 1983 - type species

References

External links
 

Crickets
Ensifera genera
Orthoptera of Australia